The discography of the Serbian rock band Smak (Serbian Cyrillic: Смак; trans. Endtime), consists of ten studio albums, three live albums, five compilation albums, three EPs, and seven singles.

Studio albums

EPs

Live albums

Compilation albums

Singles

External links
 EX YU ROCK enciklopedija 1960-2006, Janjatović Petar; 

Discographies of Serbian artists
Rock music group discographies